Ntenjeru County is a county in the Kayunga District in Uganda. It occupies the southern half of the district. It contains four sub-counties and one municipality:

Sub-Counties 

Kayunga Sub-county
Busaana Sub-county
Nazigo Sub-county
Kangulumira Sub-county
Kayunga Municipality

See also 
 Bbaale County
 Bbaale
 Ntenjeru
 Nazigo

References 

Counties of Kayunga District
Kayunga District